Walter Firle or Walther Firle (August 22, 1859 in Breslau – November 20, 1929 in Munich) was a portrait and genre painter.

He was born in Breslau (now Wrocław) and died in Munich, where much of his work remains in public collections. Perhaps his most notable work is the portrait of King Ludwig III that was used for several postal stamp designs in the state of Bavaria.

External links

Walter Firle on artnet

1859 births
1929 deaths
Artists from Wrocław
19th-century German painters
19th-century German male artists
German male painters
20th-century German painters
20th-century German male artists